

Old Polish (Pre 1500)
Poles began writing in the 12th century using the Latin alphabet. This alphabet, however, was ill-equipped to deal with Polish phonology, particularly the palatal consonants (now written as ś, ź, ć, dź), the retroflex group (now sz, ż, and cz) as well as the nasal vowels (now written as ą, ę). Consequently, Polish spelling in the Middle Ages was highly inconsistent as writers struggled to adapt the Latin alphabet to the needs of the Polish language. There was no unified system; different writers came up with different systems before the modern Polish orthography was firmly established. 

In the earliest documents the letter c could signify c, cz, or k while the letter z was used for ś, z, ź, and ż. Writers soon began to experiment with digraphs (combinations of letters), new letters (ø and ſ), and eventually diacritics.

1440 Reform
Jakub Parkoszowic (Jacobus Parcossii) in 1440 was the first to attempt to introduce an orthographic reform titled Traktat o ortografii polskiej (Treatise on Polish Orthography) that was ultimately failed and wasn't rediscovered until 1830.

In it he suggests the use of doubling vowels to represent vowel length, a feature of Old and Middle Polish. He also suggests the use of ø for nasal vowels  and ÿ for the phoneme /ɨ/, as well as a number of digraphs and trigraphs.

Middle Polish (1500-1750)
Several grammarians attempted to introduce orthographic standards in the Middle Polish period, with varying success.

Stanisław Zaborowski’s Orthography of 1514–1515
Around 1514, Stanisław Zaborowski wrote Orthographia seu modus recte scribendi et legendi Polonicum idioma quam utilissimus (Orthography, that is the most useful way of correct writing and reading in the Polish language). In it, he attempts to fill the gaps left by the writing system used by Latin by including digraphs and diacritics.

He expresses disdain for the usage of g for the sound /j/, particularly in native words.

His decisions were informed by Parkoszowic's attempted reform as well as Czech.

He proposed the following letters:
a, á, ạ, ą, b, b̈, c, c̈, ċ, d, ď, ◌̈d, ḋ, e, ē, f, g, ◌̈g, h, i, ī, k ◌̈k, l, ł, m, m̈, n, n̈, o, ō, p, p̈, r, ṙ, s, s̈, ṡ, t, u, v, v̈, w, ẅ, x, ẍ, ẋ, y, z, z̈, ż.

The orthography was not used in many works, however it influenced works such as Raj duszny printed around 1513 and Początek święte Ewanielije podług świętego Jana around 1518/1519.

Seklucjan’s grammar of 1549
In 1549 Jan Seklucjan (Joannis Seclvcianus) wrote Krótka a prosta nauka czytania i pisania języka polskiego (A short and simple study of reading and writing in the Polish language), in which he laments the difficulty of reading Polish. 

In this book, he introduced 11 vowel letters, a, â, ą, e, ę, i, o, u, ü, w, y. At this time, the phonemes /i/ and /ɨ/ were still not often distinguished, and in the work itself one can find examples such as "gdi" (modern gdy).

Murzynowski’s reform of 1551
In response to Seklucjan’s grammar, Stanisław Murzynowski wrote Ortografija polská. To jest nauka pisániá i czytaniá języka polskié(go), ilé Polákowi potrzebá, niewielem słów dostatecznie wypisaná (Polish orthography, that is learning to read and write the Polish language, as much as Poles need, written in sufficient but few words) in 1551. In it, Murzynowski introduced 51 graphemes.

Most notably, the long vowels were distinguished with an acute accent, the so-called slanted (pochylone) vowels (á, é, ó), palatalized consonants were distinguished using a diacritic (b̍, p̍, and v̍, modern bi, pi, and wi, the character ċ was also introduced to represent /t͡ɕ/ (modern ć), which caused some controversy, as the letter was already used mostly in the digraph ċz (modern cz). A special letter ɀ was suggested for the sound /ʑ/, and along with it the digraph dɀ for /d͡ʑ/ (modern dź and dzi). The letter s̈ for the sound /ɕ/. The ligature ß and the digraphs ſſ and ſs (modern [sz]) were suggested for /ʂ/.

Murzynowski also suggested that the letter x be used to represent the sounds /ks/ and /kɕ/ in loanwords.

Before, the sounds /i/ and /j/ were often written using only the grapheme i, as in Latin, however they were at times distinguished, namely in the Polish translation of the New Testament using the letters i and y repectively. Murzynowski was the first to suggest the two sounds be systematically distinguished and introduced the letter j, and the usage of g to represent /j/ dropped. He also suggested the use of yj for the sound /ɨj/, as is the case in modern Polish, as it was previously unwritten.

{{blockquote|text=

przyjdzi, przyjmi. That is now what we should pronounce. Those who don't know write przydzi, przymi instead of przyjdzi, przyjmi, or 'przéjdzi, przéjmi, but neither is right, especially przéjdzi, przéjmi. Because that means something else than przyjdzi, przyjmi, as when I say przejdzi przez tę rzékę, przéjmi moje konie rć.
|multiline=yes
|author=Stanisław Murzynowski
|title=Ortografija polská. To jest nauka pisániá i czytaniá języka polskié(go), ilé Polákowi potrzebá, niewielem słów dostatecznie wypisaná
}}

Onufry Kopczyński
Onufry Kopczyński wrote his grammars on the commission of Towarzystwo do Ksiąg Elementarnych, a department of Towarzystwo do Ksiąg Elementarnych. He spent several chapters in Grammatyka dla szkół narodowych na klassę 1 and Grammatyka dla szkół narodowych na klassę 2 on what correct punctuation should be, which was not usually discussed in previous orthography books.

Modern Polish (1750-present)
Many of the standards introduced in the previous centuries ultimately fell out of use, leading to the reforms of the 19th century.

19th century
In 1816 Alojzy Feliński published Przyczyny używanej przeze mnie pisowni in Pisma własne i przekładania wiérszem Aloizego Felińskiego. In it, he suggested the following changes:

 Removal of á in favor of a.
 The usage of j for /j/ instead of i and y, except in foreign words: kray ⟶ kraj, iayko ⟶ jajko, moie ⟶ moje.
 The usage of -ć, -c, -dz in infinitives: być, piec, módc (modern móc).

Then in 1830 the Warsaw Society of Friends of Learning published Rozprawy i wnioski o ortografii polskiej, but it did not reach a wider audience.

In 1890, the committee Academy of Learning was established and composed of linguists and other academics. A year later, they published their resolutions, to which Jan Baudouin de Courtenay, Aleksander Brückner, Antoni Kalina, and  protested. The two groups attempted to reach an agreement through discussions in 1906 led by Jan Baudouin de Courtenay. The following changes were suggested:
 ja instead of ia, ya in final syllables.
 gie instead of ge. -im, -ym as well as -imi, -ymi alongside -emi in masculine adjectives in instrumental and locative.
 -c instead of -dz for some infinitives, for example móc. Anterior adverbial participles without internal ł: rzekszy, zjadszy.The Provisional Council of State requested in 1916 that the following changes be implemented, but the Lwów Scientific Society voiced opposition, and yet more compromise was to be found in more committees organized in 1917. Finally, in 1918, the following changes were accepted and adopted.
 The usage of  j in non-initial syllables was accepted.
  -em, -emi were to be differentiated from -ym, -ymi for instrumental and locative according to an adjective's nominative ending.
 ke and ge were to be written in loan words, and kie and gie were to be written in native and nativized words.
 -c for some infinitives was kept.
 Anterior adverbial participles were to be written with an internal ł: zjadłszy.However, despite all this, the proposed orthographic changes were not widely accepted, which led to the final reform, which took place in 1936.

1936 Reform
In 1935, the Polish Academy of Arts and Sciences initiated the final major orthographic reform. The following changes were proposed and implemented:

 Strings of consonants + ja (e.g. Marja) would now be written with i instead of j, except after c, s, z (eg. Francja, pasja, diecezja).
 Removal of the distinction of -ym, -ymi and -em, -emi in adjectives, leaving only -ym and -ymi.
 Foreign ke would be written kie, but foreign ge as ge. A preference for writing adverbialized prepositional phrases separately (e.g. na razie'').

The article also concerns capitalization and punctuation. The changes were met with disapproval. However, through government regulation and implementation in schools, the changes eventually became standard. Since then, only minor changes regarding the spelling of foreign words have been implemented.

See also
Polish orthography
Cyrillization of Polish
Old Polish language
Middle Polish
Evolution of the Polish language
Polish phonology
Help:IPA/Polish

Further reading
  [a scan]
  [a scan in the DjVu format]
  [a transcription]
  [a transcription]

Notes

References
 
 
 
 
 
 
 
 
 
 
 
 

Polish language
Orthography